Edoardo Bisconcin (born 8 October 1972) is a professional Motocross,  Rally, Ferrari Challenge Europe, and Euro Formula 3000 race driver.

Career
 1990–1994: Motocross
 1995: Rally
 2003: Ferrari Challenge Europe
 2004: Euro Formula 3000

References

Italian racing drivers
Italian motocross riders
1972 births
Living people

Euronova Racing drivers